E. V. Krishna Pillai (14 September 1894 – 30 March 1938) was an Indian writer of Malayalam literature and member of Sree Moolam Popular Assembly of Travancore. He was known to be a multi-talented personality and excelled as an advocate, Member of Legislative Assembly, editor and writer. During his short life, he wrote comedies, dramas, short stories and an autobiography. He was also a columnist and a caricaturist. He was an eminent satirist and a genius in comedy.

Biography 
E. V. Krishna Pillai was born on 14 September 1894 at Kunnathur Taluk of Quilon to Pappu Pillai and Kalyani Amma.

After completing his schooling at Kunnathur, Krishna Pillai went on to graduate in Arts and Law and started his career as a government servant. He married Maheswari Amma, the youngest daughter of writer, C. V. Raman Pillai. The couple had five sons and two daughters. Chandraji (Ramachandran Nair), the eldest, was a  film actor, the second son, Adoor Bhasi (Bhaskaran Nair), and the third, Padmanabhan Nair (Padman), a journalist and the writer of the cartoon Kunchu Kurup. His other children were Omana Amma, Rajalakshmi Amma, Sankaran Nair (who died at the young age of 18 due to heart disease) and Krishnan Nair.

Later, he took up the positions as Editor of publications such as Malayali and Malayala Manorama. Pillai during this period, shifted his residence to Peringanad, near Adoor in erstwhile Travancore state. He also served as a member of the Sree Moolam Popular Assembly of Travancore.

 

Krishna Pillai died on 30 March 1938 at the young age of 43.

The E. V. Krishna Pillai Smaraka Sahitya Award has been instituted in his honour by Piravi Samskarika Samithi.

Works

Hasya Krithikal (comedy)

Naatakangalum Prahasanangalum (coma and farce)

Aathmakadha (autobiography)

Cherukadha (short story) 

   2 ente gandharvasnehithan

Novel

Prabandha Samahaaram (collection of essays)

Baala Saahithyam (children's literature) 

E. V also co-authored books like Veeramahathwam with A. Sankara Pillai, Gaandhi Kaalam Onapaattu with C. V. KunjuRaaman.

References

External links 
 

Writers from Thiruvananthapuram
Malayalam-language writers
1894 births
1938 deaths
Members of the Sree Moolam Popular Assembly
20th-century Indian dramatists and playwrights
20th-century Indian essayists
20th-century Indian novelists
Indian children's writers
Novelists from Kerala